Yan Zhen (born 1930) is a Chinese poet, painter, and calligrapher, best known in China for his writing. Yan has published over 30 works of literature, including poetry, prose, and fiction. He was the editor of Jiaodong Daily, the Deputy Head of the Anhui Journal of Art and Literature, vice editor in chief of Qing Ming Journal, editor in chief of Poetry Journal, and a council member of the China Writers Association, or CWA. Yan lives and works in Beijing.

Life and work 
Yan was born in 1930 in Laiyang, Shandong Province, and spent most of his childhood in a small village with his family. His father was a primary school teacher. He left home at thirteen to join the revolutionary forces resisting the Japanese occupation.

During the Cultural Revolution (1966–1976), Yan was denounced by Red Guards. Both he and his wife were sent to separate parts of the countryside as a result. In 1985, Yan was among the first delegation of Chinese writers to go abroad after the end of the Cultural Revolution, and visited a number of American cities.

Writing 
Yan published his first volume of poetry at 24. In the early stage of his career he was one of the five “Great Young Poets”, lauded as recorders of the social and cultural zeitgeist. He has been described as "one of the most promising poets in the early years of the founding of the People's Republic of China". In 1963-64, he was considered among the most successful young poets in the nation.

Notable works include Girl Beside the Huai River (1955), Jiangnan Song, Guqin Spring, the essay collection Peony Courtyard, the novel Barren Tracks, and the novella Rose of the Southern Country.

Painting 
Yan uses both watercolor and oil.

His work has been exhibited in China and internationally, including at the National Art Museum of China. His watercolor Beginning to Snow at Lotus Pond was sold in a 2007 Sotheby's auction in New York. He had his first show in the city in 2008, at the Fuller Building's Neuhoff Gallery.

References

External links 
 Yan Zhen's website.

1930 births
Living people
Painters from Shandong
20th-century Chinese poets
Chinese children's writers
People of the Republic of China
Artists from Yantai
Poets from Shandong
People's Republic of China painters
People's Republic of China poets
Writers from Yantai